Britt-Marie "Bibbi" Ericson (born 25 January 1950 as Britt-Marie Lundin) is a Swedish female curler.

Teams

References

External links

Living people
1941 births
Swedish female curlers
European curling champions
Swedish curling champions